After Hours with Sarah Vaughan is a compilation album by Sarah Vaughan released in 1955 on the Columbia Records label. She recorded for Columbia from 1949 to 1953 and the album picks up some of her choice recordings for the label.

Track listing
After Hours
Street of Dreams
You Taught Me to Love Again
You're Mine, You (Johnny Green, Edward Heyman)
My Reverie
Summertime
Black Coffee
Thinking of You
I Cried for You
Perdido
Deep Purple
Just Friends

References

1955 albums
Sarah Vaughan albums